Los Morochucos (from Quechua Muru Chuku) is one of six districts of the  Cangallo Province in Peru.

Geography 
Other mountains are listed below:

 Chuntalla
 Marayniyuq
 Parya Wanka
 Tuqtucha Urqu
 Uchku Mach'ay Urqu

Ethnic groups 
The people in the district are mainly indigenous citizens of Quechua descent. Quechua is the language which the majority of the population (93.40%) learnt to speak in childhood, 6.34% of the residents started speaking using the Spanish language (2007 Peru Census).

References